A number of ships were named Duke of Lancaster, including:

Ship names